Yunzhou Township is a township in northwestern Hebei province, People's Republic of China, on the upper reaches of the Bai River. It is under the administration of Chicheng County,  to the south-southeast.

History
In the 4th century CE the area was the centre of Yunzhou Province. When the Republic of China ruled all of China from 1912 to 1936, the area was in the far southeast corner of Chahar Province.

Geography
Neighbouring towns are Dushikou to the north, Chicheng Town to the south, Zhenningbao Township and Maying Township, and Dongwankou Township and Longmensuo to the east. Nearby is the Yunzhou Reservoir.

References
云州乡 (in Simplified Chinese). Accessed 2011-04-25

Township-level divisions of Hebei